Miro Griffiths (born 29 May 1989) is a prominent disabled academic and activist. Griffiths is a Leverhulme Research Fellow based at the University of Leeds where he is researching young disabled people's political engagement and activism.

Early life and education 
Born in Birkenhead, Griffiths went to West Kirby Primary School. He wanted to go to Hilbre High School but was unable to do so because of its inaccessibility. He instead went to Woodchurch High School and then Birkenhead Sixth Form. His father, Dave, was an Aerospace Engineer and his mother, Helena, a Slovenian writer.

At thirteen years old, he received a millennium award which led to the conceptualised development of a computer game promoting disability equality.

He then went on to study Psychology at the University of Liverpool, and subsequently a Master’s in Disability Studies at the University of Leeds. He completed his PhD on young disabled people in the Disabled People’s Movement at Liverpool John Moores University.

Personal life 
Griffiths is a regular contributor to broadcast media and podcasts. He has made appearances discussing disability, politics, culture and society on 'The Human Rights Podcast', and the 'Digital Disability Podcast' and 'The Football Collective' and the HuffPost. Griffiths is an ardent Wigan Athletic supporter who is also working with Dr Paul Darke on Disability and Football. He is a wheelchair user, who has spinal muscular atrophy.

Academic work
Griffiths has worked with various organisations to promote academic work on human rights and social justice amongst young disabled people across Europe. He has partnered with the Council of Europe, the Equality and Human Rights Commission, and the British Council.

He was an invited fellow of the Royal Society of Arts for recognition to disability activism and social movements.

He is currently a teaching fellow in disability studies at the University of Leeds and an editor for the International Journal of Disability and Social Justice. Also, he has been awarded the position of Leverhulme Research Fellowship at the University of Leeds.

Activism 
Griffiths is an advocate of disabled people's human rights. He has worked as a board member of the European Network on Independent Living, focusing on various aspects of disability life such as counteracting disability hate crime, social inclusion and independent living.

He is an ardent critic of assisted suicide, and is a part of the Not Dead Yet movement.

Griffiths is an active member of the Labour Party, advocating further development of disability rights and inclusion and calling for a need to ‘politicise people’s everyday experiences’. He was also a strategic and confidential advisory network to UK Labour and subsequent Coalition government as part of his role as Member of Equality 2025.

He holds various positions on the boards of various organisations promoting social justice including Independent Living Institute, Alliance for Inclusive Education, DaDaFest, and Liverpool City Region's 'Fairness and Social Justice Advisory Board'.

He was awarded member of the order of the British Empire (MBE) in the Queen's Birthday Honours list 2014. He was also named as an influential disabled activists by the Disability News Service.

References 

1989 births
Living people
English people with disabilities
English activists
People from Birkenhead